Ghoramara Island is an island 92 km south of Kolkata, India in the Sundarban Delta complex of the Bay of Bengal. The island is small, roughly five square kilometers in area, and is quickly disappearing due to erosion and sea level rise.

Shrinking of island
Global warming has caused the rivers that pour down from the Himalayas and empty into the Bay of Bengal to swell and shift in recent decades, placing these islands, known as the Sundarbans, in danger. Four islands are completely underwater, and another 10 in the area are at risk.

Population
Ghoramara island once had a population of 40,000. The 2001 Government of India census showed a population of 5,000 on Ghoramara; this population is believed to have shrunk as families are displaced by the island's sinking and many families are migrating in search of better livelihood. As of 2016 the island has 3,000 residents.

See also

 Lohachara Island
 South Talpatti Island

References

Satellite view from Google images 
International Herald Tribune article
Morphological changes of Ghoramara Island: a documentation. Indian Journal of Geography and Environment.      Vol.2, p. 64-65, 1997.
Destruction and Agony in Ghoramara Island. Paper accepted to present in the 22nd Conference of Institute of Indian Geographers (IIG) and IGU Commission meeting on Land Degradation and Desertification, January 9-1, 2001.

Islands of West Bengal
Geography of South 24 Parganas district
Sundarbans
Islands of India
Populated places in India
Islands of the Bay of Bengal